Casey LaBow (b. Samantha Casey Labow, Aug. 14, 1986, New York City) is an American film producer and actress known for her role as Kate Denali in The Twilight Saga: Breaking Dawn – Part 1 and The Twilight Saga: Breaking Dawn – Part 2.

Early life
LaBow moved from New York City to Los Angeles at the age of 16 with her mother and sister, and by age 18, had auditioned for. and was accepted into, the American Academy of Dramatic Arts West in Hollywood, California.  She auditioned five times for the role of Kate Denali for The Twilight Saga: Breaking Dawn – Part 1 before finally being cast.

Filmography
 London (2005) as Dominatrix
 Dirty (2005) as Girl in BMW
 The Unknown (2005) as Shea Landers
 Moonlight (2007) as Cherish
 Backyards & Bullets (2007)
 CSI: NY (2008-2009) as Ella McBride
 Skateland (2010) as Candy Boyce
 Notes on Lying (2010) as Annabelle
 The Twilight Saga: Breaking Dawn – Part 1 (2011) as Kate
 Hide Away (2011) as Lauren
 The Twilight Saga: Breaking Dawn – Part 2 (2012) as Kate
 Plush (2013) as Evie
 Free the Nipple (2014) as Cali
 Banshee (2016), as Maggie Bunker (seven episodes)

References

External links
 
 

20th-century American actresses
21st-century American actresses
Actresses from New York City
Actresses from Los Angeles
American child actresses
American film actresses
Film producers from California
American television actresses
Living people
1986 births
American women film producers
Film producers from New York (state)